Group 1 of the 1970 FIFA World Cup was contested in Mexico City's Estadio Azteca between 31 May and 11 June 1970. The Soviet Union and Mexico finished level on both points and goal difference, meaning a drawing of lots was required under the tournament rules to determine the placings of the teams. The Soviet Union was drawn out and therefore were ranked as group winner, with Mexico ranked in second place. Belgium and El Salvador both failed to advance.

Standings

Matches
All times listed are local (UTC−6)

Mexico vs Soviet Union

Belgium vs El Salvador

Soviet Union vs Belgium

Mexico vs El Salvador

Soviet Union vs El Salvador

Mexico vs Belgium

References

Group 1
Soviet Union at the 1970 FIFA World Cup
Mexico at the 1970 FIFA World Cup
Belgium at the 1970 FIFA World Cup
Group